Singtongnoi Por. Telakun (สิงห์ทองน้อย ป.เตละกุล) (born June 5, 1980) is a Muay Thai fighter who is currently signed to ONE Championship. He is a former Lumpinee Stadium champion.

Biography and career
Singtongnoi started training in Muay Thai at 10 years old with his dad, who was a fighter himself. He quickly went on to fight for a few hundred baht to help his family out of poverty.

In 2015, after a long career which saw him win a Lumpinee title, Singtongnoi retired following an injury sustained in his last fight. He went back to live in the countryside and quickly accepted an offer from Evolve to teach Muay Thai in Singapore alongside former Muay Thai champions Nong-O Gaiyanghadao, Dejdamrong Sor Amnuaysirichoke, and Sagetdao Petpayathai. 

In August 2016 doctors diagnosed him with cancer. Singtongnoi overcame the disease and saw it as a new start in his life, prompting him to come out of retirement and start fighting again, this time in the ONE Championship organization in 2018. In his comeback, Singtongnoi faced Joseph Lasiri at ONE Championship: Unstoppable Dreams in a ONE Super Series Muay Thai match. He won the fight by TKO. Next, he faced Masahide Kudo under ONE Super Series kickboxing rules at ONE Championship: Kingdom of Heroes in Bangkok on October 6, 2018. He would go on to win by unanimous decision.

Singtongnoi began 2019 on a two-fight losing streak, first losing to Savvas Michael at ONE Championship: Warriors of Light on May 10, 2019 by unanimous decision. Then, at ONE Championship: Immortal Triumph on September 6, 2019, he lost to Kohei "Momotaro" Kodera by KO in just 41 seconds of the first round, marking the fastest knockout in ONE Super Series history. This record was later shattered by Capitan Petchyindee Academy, who knocked out Petchtanong Banchamek in just 6 seconds at ONE Championship: A New Breed 3 on September 18, 2020.

Titles and accomplishments
Lumpinee Stadium
 Lumpinee Stadium 126 lbs Champion

World Muay Thai Council
 2010 WMC Muay Thai World 126 lbs Champion

Rajadamnern Stadium
 2010 Rajadamnern Stadium Fighter of the Year
 2012 Rajadamnern Stadium Fight of the Year (on December 22, 2011 vs Saeksan Or. Kwanmuang)

Fight record

|-  style="background:#FFBBBB;"
| 2019-09-06|| Loss ||align=left| Kohei "Momotaro" Kodera || ONE Championship: Immortal Triumph || Ho Chi Minh City, Vietnam || KO (Punches and Elbows) || 1 || 0:41
|-  style="background:#FFBBBB;"
| 2019-05-10|| Loss ||align=left| Savvas Michael || ONE Championship: Warriors Of Light || Bangkok, Thailand || Decision (Unanimous) || 3 || 3:00
|-  style="background:#CCFFCC;"
| 2018-10-06|| Win ||align=left| Masahide Kudo || ONE Championship: Kingdom of Heroes || Bangkok, Thailand || Decision (Unanimous) || 3 || 3:00
|-  style="background:#CCFFCC;"
| 2018-05-18|| Win ||align=left| Joseph Lasiri || ONE Championship: Unstoppable Dreams || Kallang, Singapore || TKO (Doctor Stoppage) || 2 || 2:36
|-  style="background:#cfc;"
| 2015-03-22|| Win ||align=left| Yosuke Morii || WPMF JAPAN×REBELS SUK WEERASAKRECK FAIRTEX || Tokyo, Japan || KO (High Kick) || 5 || 2:40
|-  style="background:#FFBBBB;"
| 2015-01-25 || Loss ||align=left| Yokwittaya Paranchai || Chalong Boxing Stadium || Phuket, Thailand || TKO (Knee) || 4||
|-  style="background:#FFBBBB;"
| 2014-10-08 || Loss ||align=left| Phet Utong Or. Kwanmuang || Rajadamnern Stadium || Bangkok, Thailand || TKO || 3||
|-  style="background:#c5d2ea;"
| 2014-09-21|| Draw ||align=left| Genji Umeno || M-FIGHT Suk WEERASAKRECK VII || Tokyo, Japan || Decision || 5 || 3:00
|-  style="background:#cfc;"
| 2014-06-15|| Win ||align=left| Taison Maeguchi || M-FIGHT Suk WEERASAKRECK VI || Tokyo, Japan || KO || 2 || 2:27
|-  style="background:#CCFFCC;"
| 2014-05-07 || Win ||align=left| Thanonchai Thanakorngym || Rajadamnern Stadium || Bangkok, Thailand || Decision || 5 || 3:00
|-  style="background:#FFBBBB;"
| 2014-02-28 || Loss ||align=left| Petpanomrung Kiatmuu9 || Lumpinee Champion Krikkrai, Lumpinee Stadium  || Bangkok, Thailand || Decision || 5 || 3:00 
|-
! style=background:white colspan=9 |
|-  style="background:#CCFFCC;"
| 2014-02-07 || Win ||align=left| Phetmorakot Petchyindee Academy || Lumpinee Stadium || Bangkok, Thailand || Decision || 5 || 3:00
|-  style="background:#FFBBBB;"
| 2013-11-06|| Loss ||align=left| Auisiewpor Sujibhamikiao || Rajadamnern Stadium || Bangkok, Thailand || Decision || 5 || 3:00
|-  style="background:#c5d2ea;"
| 2013-10-08|| Draw ||align=left| Auisiewpor Sujibhamikiao || Lumpinee Stadium || Bangkok, Thailand || Decision || 5 || 3:00
|-  style="background:#c5d2ea;"
| 2013-08-05|| Draw ||align=left| Superbank Mor Ratanabandit || Rajadamnern Stadium || Bangkok, Thailand || Decision || 5 || 3:00
|-  style="background:#FFBBBB;"
| 2013-06-03|| Loss ||align=left| Superbank Mor Ratanabandit || Lumpinee Stadium || Bangkok, Thailand || Decision || 5 || 3:00
|-  style="background:#FFBBBB;"
| 2013-02-21 || Loss||align=left| Saeksan Or. Kwanmuang ||Rajadamnern Stadium || Bangkok, Thailand || Decision || 5 || 3:00
|-  style="background:#FFBBBB;"
| 2012-12-24|| Loss ||align=left| Kongsak Saenchaimuaythaigym || Rajadamnern Stadium || Bangkok, Thailand || Decision || 5 || 3:00
|-  style="background:#CCFFCC;"
| 2012-11-30|| Win||align=left| Saeksan Or. Kwanmuang || Lumpinee Stadium || Bangkok, Thailand || Decision || 5 || 3:00
|-  style="background:#FFBBBB;"
| 2012-11-09 || Loss||align=left| Saeksan Or. Kwanmuang || Lumpinee Stadium || Bangkok, Thailand || Decision || 5 || 3:00
|-  style="background:#CCFFCC;"
| 2012-10-11 || Win ||align=left| Yokvitaya Phetsimean || Rajadamnern Stadium || Bangkok, Thailand || Decision || 5 || 3:00
|-  style="background:#CCFFCC;"
| 2012-09-12 || Win ||align=left| Kaimukkao Por.Thairongruangkamai || Lumpinee Stadium || Bangkok, Thailand || TKO (Elbow)|| 3 ||
|-  style="background:#c5d2ea;"
| 2012-06-26 || Draw ||align=left| Yodwicha Por Boonsit || Lumpinee Stadium || Bangkok, Thailand || Draw|| 5 || 3:00
|-  style="background:#fbb;"
| 2012-02-28|| Loss||align=left| Mongkolchai Kwaitonggym || Lumpinee Stadium || Bangkok, Thailand || TKO (Doctor Stoppage)||  ||
|-  style="background:#FFBBBB;"
| 2012-01-26 || Loss ||align=left| Jomthong Chuwattana || Wansongchai, Rajadamnern Stadium || Bangkok, Thailand || Decision || 5 || 3:00
|-  style="background:#CCFFCC;"
| 2011-12-22|| Win ||align=left| Saeksan Or. Kwanmuang || Rajadamnern Stadium || Bangkok, Thailand || Decision || 5 || 3:00
|-  style="background:#CCFFCC;"
| 2011-08-18|| Win ||align=left| Wanchalerm Chor.Chunkamon || Rajadamnern Stadium || Bangkok, Thailand || Decision || 5 || 3:00
|-  style="background:#CCFFCC;"
| 2011-06-02|| Win ||align=left| Noppakrit Namplatahoimouk || Rajadamnern Stadium || Bangkok, Thailand || Decision || 5 || 3:00
|-  style="background:#FFBBBB;"
| 2011-03-15|| Loss ||align=left|  Phet-Ek Kiatyongyut|| Lumpinee Stadium || Bangkok, Thailand || Decision || 5 || 3:00
|-  style="background:#FFBBBB;"
| 2011-02-21|| Loss ||align=left| Kongsak Saenchaimuaythaigym|| Rajadamnern Stadium || Bangkok, Thailand || Decision || 5 || 3:00
|-  style="background:#FFBBBB;"
| 2011-01-20 || Loss ||align=left| Pakorn PKSaenchaimuaythaigym || Rajadamnern Stadium || Bangkok, Thailand || TKO (Punches) || 2 ||
|-  style="background:#CCFFCC;"
| 2010-12-16 || Win ||align=left| Kongnakornban Sor. Kitrungrot || Rajadamnern Stadium || Bangkok, Thailand || Decision || 5 || 3:00
|-  style="background:#CCFFCC;"
| 2010-11-02 ||Win ||align=left| Sam-A Gaiyanghadao || Lumpinee Stadium || Bangkok, Thailand || Decision || 5 || 3:00
|-  style="background:#CCFFCC;"
| 2010-10-05 ||Win||align=left| Pornsanae Sitmonchai || Lumpinee Stadium || Bangkok, Thailand || Decision || 5 || 3:00 
|-
! style=background:white colspan=9 |
|-  style="background:#CCFFCC;"
| 2010-09-07 || Win ||align=left| Jomthong Chuwattana || Suek Petsupapan, Lumpinee Stadium || Bangkok, Thailand || Decision || 5 || 3:00
|-
|-  style="background:#FFBBBB;"
| 2010-08-04 || Loss ||align=left| Fahmai Skindewgym || Sor.Sommai Rajadamnern Stadium  || Bangkok, Thailand || Decision || 5 || 3:00
|-  style="background:#CCFFCC;"
| 2010-06-10 || Win||align=left| Jomthong Chuwattana || Suek Onesongchai, Rajadamnern Stadium || Bangkok, Thailand || Decision || 5 || 3:00
|-  style="background:#CCFFCC;"
| 2010-02-11 || Win||align=left| Jomthong Chuwattana || Suek Petthongkam, Rajadamnern Stadium || Bangkok, Thailand || Decision || 5 || 3:00
|-  style="background:#FFBBBB;"
| 2009-11-26 || Loss ||align=left| Pettawee Sor Kittichai || One Songchai || Bangkok, Thailand || Decision || 5 || 3:00
|-  style="background:#FFBBBB;"
| 2009-08-06 || Loss ||align=left| Sittisak Petpayathai || Rajadamnern vs Lumpinee Rajadamnern Stadium || Bangkok, Thailand || Decision || 5 || 3:00
|-  style="background:#FFBBBB;"
| 2009-07-03 || Loss ||align=left| Nong-O Kaiyanghadaogym || Suek Lumpinee vs Rajadamnern Special || Bangkok, Thailand || Decision || 5 || 3:00
|-  style="background:#CCFFCC;"
| 2009-06-08 || Win  ||align=left| Pakorn PKSaenchaimuaythaigym || One Songchai Rajadamnern Stadium || Bangkok, Thailand || Decision || 5 || 3:00

|-  style="background:#CCFFCC;"
| 2009-05-09 || Win  ||align=left| Phetto Sitjaopho || One Songchai  || Yasothon Province, Thailand || Decision || 5 || 3:00

|-  style="background:#FFBBBB;"
| 2009-03-06 || Loss ||align=left| Pettawee Sor Kittichai || One Songchai || Maha Sarakham Province, Thailand || Decision || 5 || 3:00
|-  style="background:#CCFFCC;"
| 2009-01-14 || Win ||align=left| Pettawee Sor Kittichai || One Songchai Rajadamnern Stadium || Bangkok, Thailand || Decision || 5 || 3:00
|-  style="background:#c5d2ea;"
| 2008-11-23 || Draw||align=left| Sittisak Petpayathai || Channel 7 Stadium || Bangkok, Thailand || Decision || 5 || 3:00
|-  style="background:#c5d2ea;"
| 2008-10-13 || Draw ||align=left| Nong-O Kaiyanghadaogym || Sor Sommai, Rajadamnern Stadium || Bangkok, Thailand || Decision draw || 5 || 3:00
|-  style="background:#FFBBBB;"
| 2008-08-28 || Loss ||align=left| Bovy Sor Udomson || Suek Onesongchai, Rajadamnern Stadium || Bangkok, Thailand || TKO || 3 ||
|-  style="background:#FFBBBB;"
| 2008-05-01 || Loss ||align=left| Phetto Sitjaopor || Daorungchujarern, Rajadamnern Stadium || Bangkok, Thailand || Decision || 5 || 3:00
|-  style="background:#cfc;"
| 2008-03-08 || Win||align=left| Phetek Sitjaopo || Onesongchai || Sakon Nakhon Province, Thailand || Decision || 5 || 3:00
|-  style="background:#cfc;"
| 2008-01-21 || Win||align=left| Phetek Sitjaopo ||  Rajadamnern Stadium || Bangkok, Thailand || Decision || 5 || 3:00
|-  style="background:#cfc;"
| 2007-12-19 || Win||align=left| Phetsanguan Sitniwat||  Rajadamnern Stadium || Bangkok, Thailand || Decision || 5 || 3:00
|-  style="background:#cfc;"
| 2007-11-24 || Win||align=left| Thongsuk Sor.Damrongrit||  One Songchai || Thailand || KO || 3 ||
|-  style="background:#FFBBBB;"
| 2007-07-16 || Loss ||align=left| Pettawee Sor Kittichai || One Songchai Rajadamnern Stadium || Bangkok, Thailand || Decision || 5 || 3:00
|-  style="background:#FFBBBB;"
| 2007-06-25 || Loss ||align=left| Pettawee Sor Kittichai || One Songchai Rajadamnern Stadium || Bangkok, Thailand || Decision || 5 || 3:00

|-  bgcolor="#FFBBBB"
| 2007-03-08 || Loss ||align=left| Anuwat Kaewsamrit || Wansongchai, Rajadamnern Stadium || Bangkok, Thailand || Decision || 5 || 3:00
|-  bgcolor="#FFBBBB"
| 2006-12-28 || Loss ||align=left| Ronnachai Naratrikul || Rajadamnern Stadium || Bangkok, Thailand || Decision || 5 || 3:00
|-  bgcolor="#FFBBBB"
| 2006-10-19 || Loss ||align=left| Anuwat Kaewsamrit ||  Wansongchai, Rajadamnern Stadium || Bangkok, Thailand || TKO || 3 || 
|-
! style=background:white colspan=9 |
|-
|-  bgcolor="#c5d2ea"
| 2006-09-04 || Draw ||align=left| Anuwat Kaewsamrit || Daorungchujaroen, Rajadamnern Stadium || Bangkok, Thailand || Decision draw || 5 || 3:00
|-
! style=background:white colspan=9 |
|-
|-  style="background:#cfc;"
| 2006-07-28 || Win ||align=left| Rittidej Naratrikul ||  Lumpinee Stadium || Bangkok, Thailand || Decision || 5 || 3:00
|-  style="background:#cfc;"
| 2006-06-16 || Win ||align=left| Petchthaksin Sor.Thammaphet ||  Lumpinee Stadium || Bangkok, Thailand || Decision || 5 || 3:00
|-  style="background:#FFBBBB;"
| 2006-05-08 || Loss  ||align=left| Bovy Sor Udomson || Wansongchai, Rajadamnern Stadium || Bangkok, Thailand || Decision || 5 || 3:00
|-  style="background:#CCFFCC;"
| 2006-04-06 || Win ||align=left| Bovy Sor Udomson || Wansongchai, Rajadamnern Stadium || Bangkok, Thailand || Decision || 5 || 3:00
|-  style="background:#FFBBBB;"
| 2006-03-06 || Loss ||align=left| Jomthong Chuwattana || Wansongchai, Rajadamnern Stadium || Bangkok, Thailand || Decision || 5 || 3:00
|-  style="background:#CCFFCC;"
| 2005-11-17 || Win ||align=left| Lerdsila Chumpairtour || Daorungchujarean, Rajadamnern Stadium || Bangkok, Thailand || Decision || 5 || 3:00

|-  style="background:#CCFFCC;"
| 2005-10- || Win ||align=left| Dejsak Sor.Thammaphet ||  Rajadamnern Stadium || Bangkok, Thailand || Decision || 5 || 3:00
|-  style="background:#CCFFCC;"
| 2005-09-29 || Win ||align=left| Saengarthit SasiprapaGym ||  Rajadamnern Stadium || Bangkok, Thailand || Decision || 5 || 3:00
|-  style="background:#cfc;"
| 2005-09-05 || Win||align=left| Watcharachai Kaewsamrit || Rajadamnern Stadium || Bangkok, Thailand || Decision || 5 || 3:00
|-
|-  style="background:#FFBBBB;"
| 2005-08-04 || Loss ||align=left| Jomthong Chuwattana || Daorungchujarean, Rajadamnern Stadium || Bangkok, Thailand || Decision || 5 || 3:00

|-  style="background:#cfc;"
| 2005- || Win||align=left| Luktong Sor.Ploenchit ||   || Sanam Luang, Thailand || Decision || 5 || 3:00

|-  style="background:#cfc;"
| 2005- || Win||align=left| Surasing Nongkeepahuyuth||  Rajadamnern Stadium || Bangkok, Thailand || Decision || 5 || 3:00

|-  style="background:#cfc;"
| 2005- || Win||align=left| Jomthong Chuwattana ||  Rajadamnern Stadium || Bangkok, Thailand || Decision || 5 || 3:00

|-  style="background:#FFBBBB;"
| 2005- || Loss ||align=left| Sansak Tor.Silachai || Omnoi Stadium || Samut Sakhon, Thailand || Decision || 5 || 3:00

|-  style="background:#FFBBBB;"
| 2005- || Loss ||align=left| Sittisak Sit.Or || Omnoi Stadium || Samut Sakhon, Thailand || Decision || 5 || 3:00

|-  style="background:#fbb;"
| 2003-08-17 || Loss||align=left| Tuanthong Chatchatree || Lumpinee Stadium || Bangkok, Thailand || Decision || 5 || 3:00
|-  style="background:#cfc;"
| 2003-07-27 || Win ||align=left| Petchsinil Sor.Sakulphan  || Rajadamnern Stadium || Bangkok, Thailand || Decision || 5 || 3:00
|-  style="background:#cfc;"
| 2003-05-05 || Win ||align=left| Singphayak Ketrangsri  || Lumpinee Stadium || Bangkok, Thailand || Decision || 5 || 3:00
|-  style="background:#cfc;"
| 2003-04-17 || Win ||align=left| Chaoyangyai Sor.Chaicharoen  || Lumpinee Stadium || Bangkok, Thailand || Decision || 5 || 3:00
|-  style="background:#FFBBBB;"
| 2002-05-20 || Loss ||align=left| Panomtuanlek Sor.Siripong ||   || Bangkok, Thailand || Decision || 5 || 3:00
|-  style="background:#FFBBBB;"
| 2000-07-09 || Loss ||align=left|  Rattanasak Kratingdek || Samrong Stadium || Thailand || Decision || 5 || 3:00
|-  style="background:#FFBBBB;"
| 2000-04-29 || Loss ||align=left|  Jaroensap Don Golf Service || Lumpinee Stadium || Bangkok, Thailand || Decision || 5 || 3:00
|-  style="background:#cfc;"
| 1999-08-07 || Win ||align=left|  Jaroensap Don Golf Service || Lumpinee Stadium || Bangkok, Thailand || Decision || 5 || 3:00
|-
| colspan=9 | Legend:

References

1980 births
Singtongnoi Por.Telakun
Living people
ONE Championship kickboxers
Singtongnoi Por.Telakun